Ginger & Rosa is a 2012 coming-of-age drama film written and directed by Sally Potter and distributed by Artificial Eye. The film premiered at the Toronto International Film Festival on 7 September 2012, and was released on 19 October 2012 in the United Kingdom.

Plot

Nat and Anoushka, give birth as they hold hands, to two girls named Ginger and Rosa. Ginger and Rosa grow to become best friends and by 1962, the two are inseparable. Ginger is a compassionate girl with a desire to help the world and Rosa is a passionate young girl with a wild and an almost ungovernable personality. After hearing about the Cuban Missile Crisis on the radio, Ginger becomes interested in the Anti-nuclear_movement. She voices her concerns about the dangers of nuclear devastation to Rosa, who attempts to assuage her concerns by taking her to church. Ginger finds validation in her concerns through a group of older activists consisting of Mark 1 portrayed by Timothy Spall, Mark 2 portrayed by Oliver Platt, and Bella.

An argument over dinner leads to Roland and Nat separating. Soon after, Ginger discovers her mother has been asking the school to have more "domestic science" courses so that Ginger is more prepared for life than she had been. When Ginger discovers this, she is outraged and tells her mother that she will never have children. Ginger moves out and begins to live with her father, who has started a relationship with Rosa. Ginger is deeply disturbed when she finds out and even more so after Rosa tells her that she thinks she is pregnant. Ginger is devastated and runs off to a protest rally where she is arrested. 

After being questioned by a psychiatrist and then returning home, Ginger feverishly voices her concerns about the end of the world. However, Ginger's frantic worries about the world are a front for her anxiety caused by Roland and Rosa's relationship. Ginger blurts out the truth of the affair leading to a devastated Nat. Rosa and her mother arrive and after seeing Rosa clutch her stomach, Nat deduces she's pregnant and runs upstairs. Ginger and Mark quickly follow her, only to find the door is locked. They call Roland, who breaks the door in, and they find that Nat, though still conscious, has taken an overdose. Nat is rushed to the hospital and Rosa pleads Ginger to forgive her.

As Roland and Ginger wait for Nat in the hospital, Ginger writes a letter to Rosa, in the form of a poem. In it, she discusses their friendship and differing outlooks, pointing out that Rosa dreams of "everlasting love", whilst Ginger "loves this world". The poem ends on a hopeful note: Ginger tells Rosa that if everything works out, then there will be nothing to forgive, but she'll forgive her anyway. Roland apologises to Ginger, but she turns away from him and continues to write.

Cast
 Elle Fanning as Ginger
 Alice Englert as Rosa
 Alessandro Nivola as Roland, Ginger's father
 Christina Hendricks as Natalie, Ginger's mother
 Jodhi May as Anoushka, Rosa's mother
 Luke Cloud as Rosa's father
 Timothy Spall as Mark
 Oliver Platt as Mark II
 Annette Bening as May Bella

Production
Ginger & Rosa shot at several locations in Kent including Denge Marsh acoustic mirrors at RAF Denge, Lydd-on-Sea, Lade Beach, Greatstone-on-Sea, Lydd Ranges, Lydd, and Queenborough on the Isle of Sheppey. The film is dedicated: "In loving memory of Caroline Potter (1930-2010)" who was the director's mother.

Release 
The film was released in select theaters in the United States on March 15, 2013 by A24. It later received a VOD and DVD-exclusive release in the United States by Lions Gate Home Entertainment.

Reception

Critical response 
Ginger & Rosa received generally positive reviews from critics. On Rotten Tomatoes the film has an approval rating of 78% based on reviews from 114 critics, with an average rating of 6.74/10. The site's consensus is that "Elle Fanning gives a terrific performance in this powerful coming-of-age tale about a pair of teenage girls whose friendship is unnerved by the threat of nuclear war." On Metacritic, the film has a score of 69 out of 100 based on reviews from 26 critics, indicating "generally favorable reviews."

A.O. Scott of the New York Times praised Fanning for her performance: "Ms. Fanning, who is younger than her character, shows a nearly Streepian mixture of poise, intensity and technical precision. It is frightening how good she is and hard to imagine anything she could not do." Ty Burr, film critic for The Boston Globe, praised her "luminous naturalism that seems the opposite of performance" and felt that "Fanning easily convinces you of Ginger's emotional reality."
Roger Ebert of Chicago Sun-Times gave it 3 out of 4 and wrote: "It's a portrait of a time and place, characters keeping company around a simple kitchen table, and the helplessness adolescents feel when faced with the priorities of those in power. What I'll take away from it is the knowledge that now the Fannings have given us two actresses of such potential." 
Peter Bradshaw of The Guardian wrote: "This is a teenage movie that could in other hands have been precious; instead it has delicacy and intelligence."

Peter Debruge of Variety wrote: ""Potter seems at a loss to communicate the ideas behind her agonizingly elliptical picture, leaving auds to marvel at the gorgeous cinematography and scarlet-red hair of its heroine, earnestly played by Elle Fanning in a project undeserving of her talents."

Swedish critic Pidde Andersson compared the film favourably to the films of Jean Rollin.

Accolades

References

External links
 
 

2012 films
2010s coming-of-age drama films
2012 independent films
2010s teen drama films
A24 (company) films
British coming-of-age drama films
British independent films
British teen drama films
Danish coming-of-age drama films
Danish independent films
Canadian coming-of-age drama films
Canadian independent films
Canadian teen drama films
Croatian drama films
Croatian independent films
English-language Canadian films
English-language Croatian films
English-language Danish films
Films set in 1962
Films set in London
Films shot in Kent
2012 drama films
2010s English-language films
2010s female buddy films
British female buddy films
2010s American films
2010s Canadian films
2010s British films